Hardham is a small village in the Horsham District of West Sussex, England. It is in the civil parish of Coldwaltham.

Archaeology
The village is on the line of Stane Street Roman road, which changes direction here, leaving the modern A29 road which has followed it from Capel, to head southwest to Bignor and Chichester. The Sussex Greensand Way from Lewes joined Stane Street here and remains of a Roman way station or mansio have been found.

Parish church

The Church of England parish church of St Botolph has some of the oldest surviving wall paintings in the country, including an image of Saint George at the Siege of Antioch in AD 1097.

The paintings date from the early 12th century. They survived due to being covered by plaster until uncovered in 1866.

The painters used colours made from locally available materials — red and yellow ochre, lime white, carbon black, and a green from copper carbonate.

The paintings are in two tiers on each wall and originally had inscriptions describing the scenes above them. One of these can still be seen on the east wall of the nave.

The themes of the paintings are Adam and Eve, the life of Christ, the Last Judgment and Apocalypse, and the Labours of the Months.

Economic and social history
On higher ground on the south side of the village are the remains of Hardham Priory, the Priory of St Cross, which was an Augustinian monastery established in the middle of the 13th century.

In the late 18th century a canal tunnel was built on the Arun Navigation to avoid a large loop of the River Arun. On 18 October 2019 the tunnel was Grade II listed.

References

External links

Horsham District
Villages in West Sussex